The Archdiocese of Boston is a Latin Church ecclesiastical territory or archdiocese of the Catholic Church located in the New England region of the United States. Its territorial remit encompasses the whole of Essex County, Middlesex County, Norfolk County, and Suffolk County, and also all of Plymouth County except the towns of Marion, Mattapoisett, and Wareham in the Commonwealth of Massachusetts. It is led by a prelate archbishop who serves as pastor of the mother church, Cathedral of the Holy Cross in the South End of Boston. The Archdiocese of Boston is a metropolitan see with six suffragan dioceses: the Dioceses of Burlington, Fall River, Manchester, Portland in Maine, Springfield in Massachusetts, and Worcester.

As of 2018, there are 284 parishes in the archdiocese, 617 diocesan priests, and 275 deacons.  In 2018, the archdiocese estimated that more than 1.9 million Catholics were in its territory.

History

Early history
New England's first settlers were Congregationalists and, in Rhode Island, Baptists who were disappointed that Protestant reforms in the Church of England did not go far enough. These dissenters followed Martin Luther and John Calvin in rejecting the selling of indulgences, the celebration of a Latin Mass, the doctrine of transubstantiation, and papal authority.  Several of the colonies thus enacted anti-Catholic statutes, banning Catholic worship and Massachusetts even made it a crime, with a potential sentence of imprisonment for life, for a Catholic priest to reside in the colony.

The political necessity of the American Revolutionary War drove a change in popular attitudes.  The Constitution of the Commonwealth of Massachusetts, written by John Adams and ratified in 1780, established religious freedom in the new state—and, being the first state constitution, its framework of government became a model for the constitutions of other states and, eventually, for the federal constitution.

On November 2, 1788, the Abbé de la Poterie, a former French naval chaplain serving Boston, celebrated the city's first public Mass in a converted Huguenot chapel located at 24 School Street in Boston, which he named Holy Cross Church.  Two refugees from the French Revolution ministering to Boston's Catholic population at the turn of the century, Fr. Francis Anthony Matignon and Fr. Jean Louis Lefebvre, raised the funds to build a larger building, the Church of the Holy Cross.  These buildings no longer exist, but they were the foundation of the Catholic Church in Massachusetts.

Formation
Pope Pius VII erected the Diocese of Boston April 8, 1808, taking the territory of the states of Connecticut, Massachusetts (the territory of which included the present state of Maine at that time), New Hampshire, Rhode Island, and Vermont from the Diocese of Baltimore.  He simultaneously erected the Diocese of New York, the Diocese of Philadelphia, and the Diocese of Bardstown (Kentucky), also taking their territory from the Diocese of Baltimore, and elevated the Diocese of Baltimore to a metropolitan archdiocese, designating all four new dioceses as its suffragans.

Exponential growth of the Catholic Church in New England through the nineteenth and twentieth centuries led to gradual reconfiguration of the ecclesiastical structure of the original territory of the Diocese of Boston.

 On 20 November 1843, Pope Gregory XVI erected the Diocese of Hartford, taking the states of Connecticut and Rhode Island and Barnstable County, Bristol County, Dukes County, Nantucket County and the towns of Marion, Mattapoisett, and Wareham along the south coast of Plymouth County of Massachusetts from the Diocese of Boston and making it a suffragan of the Archdiocese of Baltimore.
 On 19 July 1850, Pope Pius IX elevated the Diocese of New York to a metropolitan archdiocese, assigning the Diocese of Boston, the Diocese of Hartford, the Diocese of Albany, and the Diocese of Buffalo as its initial suffragan sees.
 On 29 July 1853, Pope Pius IX erected the Diocese of Burlington, taking the State of Vermont from the Diocese of Boston, and the Diocese of Portland, taking the states of Maine and New Hampshire from the Diocese of Boston.  He designated both new dioceses as suffragans of the Metropolitan Archdiocese of New York.  (The title of the Diocese of Portland formally became Diocese of Portland in Maine when Pope Pius XI transferred the see of the Archdiocese of Oregon City to Portland, Oregon, thus changing the title of the latter to Archdiocese of Portland in Oregon, on 26 September 1928.)
 On 14 June 1870, Pope Pius IX erected the Diocese of Springfield, taking Berkshire County, Franklin County, Hampden County, Hampshire County, and Worcester County from the Diocese of Boston and making it a suffragan of the Metropolitan Archdiocese of New York.  This action reduced the territory of the Diocese of Boston to that of the present metropolitan archdiocese.  (The title of the Diocese of Springfield formally became Diocese of Springfield in Massachusetts when Pope Pius XI moved the see of the Diocese of Alton to Springfield, Illinois, thus changing the title of the latter to Diocese of Springfield in Illinois, on 26 October 1923.)
 On 16 February 1872, Pope Pius IX erected the Diocese of Providence, taking the State of Rhode Island and the region of southeastern Massachusetts had been part of the Diocese of Hartford from the latter and making it a suffragan of the Metropolitan Archdiocese of New York.
 On 12 February 1875, Pope Pius IX elevated the Diocese of Boston to a metropolitan archdiocese, designating the Diocese of Burlington, the Diocese of Hartford, the Diocese of Portland, the Diocese of Providence, and the Diocese of Springfield as the initial suffragans of the new metropolitan see.  The new metropolitan province thus encompassed the original territory of the Diocese of Boston.
 On 15 April 1884, Pope Leo XIII erected the Diocese of Manchester, taking the State of New Hampshire from the Diocese of Portland and making it a suffragan of the Archdiocese of Boston.
 On 12 March 1904, Pope Pius X erected the Diocese of Fall River, taking the region of southeastern Massachusetts that were then part of the Diocese of Providence from that diocese and making it a suffragan of the Metropolitan Archdiocese of Boston.
 On 14 January 1950, Pope Pius XII erected the Diocese of Worcester, taking Worcester County from the Diocese of Springfield in Massachusetts and making it a suffragan of the Metropolitan Archdiocese of Boston.
 On 6 August 1953, Pope Pius XII erected the Diocese of Bridgeport and the Diocese of Norwich, taking the respective territory thereof from the Diocese of Hartford.  He simultaneously elevated the Diocese of Hartford to a metropolitan archdiocese, designating the Diocese of Bridgeport, the Diocese of Norwich, and the Diocese of Providence as its suffragans.  This action established the present territory and configuration of both the Metropolitan Province of Boston, spanning the states of Maine, New Hampshire, Vermont, and Massachusetts, and the Metropolitan Province of Hartford, spanning the states of Connecticut and Rhode Island.

Diocesan offices
In the 1920s, Cardinal William O'Connell moved the chancery from offices near Holy Cross Cathedral in the South End to 127 Lake Street in the Brighton neighborhood of Boston. "Lake Street" was a metonym for the Bishop and the office of the Archdiocese.

In June 2004, the archdiocese sold the archbishop's residence and the chancery and surrounding lands in Brighton to Boston College, in part to defray costs associated with numerous cases of sexual abuse by clergy of the Archdiocese (see below). The offices of the Archdiocese moved to an office building that previously housed the Internet-only stock brokerage E*Trade in Braintree, Massachusetts. The archdiocesan seminary, Saint John's Seminary, remains on the property in Brighton.

Clergy sexual abuse scandal and settlements 
At the beginning of the 21st century the archdiocese was shaken by accusations of sexual abuse by clergy that culminated in the resignation of its archbishop, Cardinal Bernard Francis Law, on December 13, 2002. In September 2003, the archdiocese settled over 500 abuse-related claims for $85 million.  Victims received an average of $92,000 each and the perpetrators included 140 priests and two others.

Coat of arms
The coat of arms of the Archdiocese, shown in the information box to the right at the top of this article, has a blue shield with a gold cross and a gold "trimount" over a silver and blue "Barry-wavy" at the base of the shield.  The "trimount" of three coupreaux represents the City of Boston, the original name of which was Trimountaine in reference to the three hills on which the city's original settlement stood.  The cross, fleurettée, honors the Cathedral of the Holy Cross while also serving as a reminder that the first bishop of Boston and other early ecclesiastics were natives of France. The "Barry-wavy" is a symbol of the sea, alluding to Boston's role as a major seaport whose first non-indigenous settlers came from across the sea.

Communications media
The diocesan newspaper The Pilot has been published in Boston since 1829.

The Archdiocese's Catholic Television Center, founded in 1955, produces programs and operates the cable television network CatholicTV. From 1964 to 1966, it owned and operated a broadcast television station under the call letters WIHS-TV.

Ecclesiastical province

The Archdiocese of Boston is also metropolitan see for the Ecclesiastical province of Boston. This means that the archbishop of Boston is the metropolitan for the province. The suffragan dioceses in the province are the Diocese of Burlington, Diocese of Fall River, Diocese of Manchester, Diocese of Portland, Diocese of Springfield in Massachusetts, and the Diocese of Worcester.

Pastoral regions
The Archdiocese of Boston is divided into five pastoral regions, each headed by an episcopal vicar.

Bishops

The following are lists of the Bishops and Archbishops of Boston, Coadjutors and Auxiliaries of Boston, and their years of service. Also included are other priests of this diocese who served elsewhere as bishop.

Bishops of Boston
 Jean-Louis Lefebvre de Cheverus (1808–1823) appointed Bishop of Montauban and later Archbishop of Bordeaux (elevated to Cardinal in 1836)
 Benedict Joseph Fenwick, S.J. (1825–1846)
 John Bernard Fitzpatrick (1846–1866; coadjutor bishop 1843–1846)
 John Joseph Williams (1866–1875; coadjutor bishop 1866); elevated to Archbishop

Archbishops of Boston
 John Joseph Williams (1875–1907)
 Cardinal William Henry O'Connell (1907–1944)
 Cardinal Richard James Cushing (1944–1970)
 Cardinal Humberto Sousa Medeiros (1970–1983)
 Cardinal Bernard Francis Law (1984–2002), resigned; later appointed Archpriest of the Basilica di Santa Maria Maggiore
 Cardinal Seán Patrick O'Malley, O.F.M.Cap. (2003–present)

Current Auxiliary Bishops of Boston
 Robert Francis Hennessey (2006–present)
 Peter John Uglietto (2010–present)
 Mark William O'Connell (2016–present)
 Robert P. Reed (2016–present)

Former Auxiliary Bishops of Boston
 John Brady (1891–1910)
 Joseph Gaudentius Anderson (1909–1927)
 John Bertram Peterson (1927–1932), appointed Bishop of Manchester
 Francis Spellman (1932–1939), appointed Archbishop of New York (Cardinal in 1946)
 Richard J. Cushing (1939–1944), appointed Archbishop here (Cardinal in 1958)
 Louis Francis Kelleher (1945–1946)
 John Wright (1947–1950), appointed Bishop of Worcester, then Bishop of Pittsburgh, then Prefect of the Congregation for the Clergy (elevated to Cardinal in 1969)
 Thomas Francis Markham (1950–1952)
 Eric Francis MacKenzie (1950–1969)
 Jeremiah Francis Minihan (1954–1973)
 Thomas Joseph Riley (1959–1976)
 Daniel A. Cronin (1968–1970), appointed Bishop of Fall River and later Archbishop of Hartford
 Joseph Francis Maguire (1971–1976), appointed Coadjutor Bishop of Springfield in Massachusetts and subsequently succeeded to that see
 Lawrence Joseph Riley (1971–1990)
 Joseph John Ruocco (1974–1980)
 Thomas Vose Daily (1974–1984), appointed Bishop of Palm Beach and later Bishop of Brooklyn
 John Joseph Mulcahy (1974–1992)
 John Michael D'Arcy (1975–1985), appointed Bishop of Fort Wayne-South Bend
 Daniel Anthony Hart (1976–1995), appointed Bishop of Norwich
 Alfred C. Hughes (1981–1993), appointed Bishop of Baton Rouge and later Archbishop of New Orleans
 Robert J. Banks (1985–1990), appointed Bishop of Green Bay
 Roberto Octavio González Nieves, O.F.M. (1988–1995), appointed Coadjutor Bishop of Corpus Christi and subsequently succeeded to that see, and later Archbishop of San Juan in Puerto Rico
 John R. McNamara (1992–1999)
 John P. Boles (1992–2006)
 John Brendan McCormack (1995–1998), appointed Bishop of Manchester
 William F. Murphy (1995–2001), appointed Bishop of Rockville Centre
 Francis Xavier Irwin (1996–2009)
 Emilio S. Allué, S.D.B. (1996–2010)
 Richard Joseph Malone (2000–2004), appointed Bishop of Portland and later Bishop of Buffalo
 Richard Lennon (2001–2006), appointed Bishop of Cleveland
 Walter James Edyvean (2001–2014)
 John Anthony Dooher (2006–2018)
 Arthur L. Kennedy (2010–2017)
 Robert P. Deeley (2012–2013), appointed Bishop of Portland

Other priests of this diocese who became bishops
 William Barber Tyler, appointed Bishop of Hartford in 1843
 Patrick Thomas O'Reilly, appointed Bishop of Springfield in Massachusetts in 1870
 James Augustine Healy, appointed Bishop of Portland in 1875
 Lawrence Stephen McMahon (priest here, 1860–1872), appointed Bishop of Hartford in 1879
 Matthew Harkins, appointed Bishop of Providence in 1887
 Edward Patrick Allen, appointed Bishop of Mobile in 1897
 Louis Sebastian Walsh, appointed Bishop of Portland in 1906
 John Joseph Nilan, appointed Bishop of Hartford in 1910
 James Anthony Walsh, elected Superior General of Maryknoll and consecrated Titular Bishop in 1933
 Edward Francis Ryan, appointed Bishop of Burlington in 1944
 John Joseph Glynn, appointed Auxiliary Bishop for the Military Services, USA in 1991
Richard Joseph Malone, appointed Bishop of Portland in 2002 and later Bishop of Buffalo in 2012
 Christopher J. Coyne, appointed Auxiliary Bishop of Indianapolis in 2011 and later Bishop of Burlington
 Paul Fitzpatrick Russell, appointed Apostolic Nuncio to Turkey and Turkmenistan and Titular Archbishop in 2016

Churches

Seminaries
Pope St. John XXIII National Seminary, Weston
St. John's Seminary, Brighton
Redemptoris Mater Archdiocesan Missionary Seminary, Brookline

Education

As of 2018, the archdiocese had 112 schools with about 34,000 students in pre-kindergarten through high school.

In 1993 the archdiocese had 53,569 students in 195 archdiocesan parochial schools. Boston had the largest number of parochial schools: 48 schools with a combined total of about 16,000 students.

Superintendents 
 Msgr. Albert W. Low (1961–1972)
 Br. Bartholomew Varden, CFX (1972–1975)
 Eugene F. Sullivan (1978–1984)
 Sr. Kathleen Carr, CSJ (1990–2006)
 Mary Grassa O'Neill (2008–2014)
 Mary E. Moran (2013–2014)
 Kathleen Powers Mears (2014–2019)
Thomas W. Carroll (2019–present)

Colleges and universities 
Boston College, Chestnut Hill
Emmanuel College, Boston
Marian Court College, Swampscott
Merrimack College, North Andover
Regis College, Weston

Primary and secondary schools

 Former high schools

Other facilities
The archdiocese previously used a headquarters facility in Brighton but sold it to Boston College in 2004 for $107,400,000.

Steward Health Care System operates the former archdiocesan hospitals of Caritas Christi Health Care.

References

External links

Catholic Hierarchy Profile of the Archdiocese of Boston
Boston Globe / Spotlight / Abuse in the Catholic Church
Boston Catholic Insider (critical blog)
Boston Catholic Schools

 
Culture of Boston
Catholic Church in Massachusetts
Boston
Boston
Boston
1808 establishments in Massachusetts
Christianity in Boston